Anoplophoroides lumawigi is a species of beetle in the family Cerambycidae, and the only species in the genus Anoplophoroides. It was described by Breuning in 1980.

References

Lamiini
Beetles described in 1980